Thomas Leonard Owens (December 21, 1897 – June 7, 1948) was a U.S. Representative from Illinois.

Born in Chicago, Illinois, Owens attended the parochial schools, Northwestern University and DePaul University, Chicago, Illinois. He was graduated from Loyola University Chicago School of Law in 1926. He was admitted to the bar in 1927 and commenced practice in Chicago, Illinois. During the First World War served in the Students' Army Training Corps at Loyola University Chicago in 1918.

Owens was elected as a Republican to the 80th Congress and served from January 3, 1947, until his death in Bethesda, Maryland, June 7, 1948. He was interred in All Saints Cemetery in Des Plaines, Illinois.

See also
 List of United States Congress members who died in office (1900–49)

References

Thomas Leonard Owens, Late A Representative

1897 births
1948 deaths
American people of Welsh descent
DePaul University alumni
Northwestern University alumni
Loyola University Chicago School of Law alumni
Republican Party members of the United States House of Representatives from Illinois
Politicians from Chicago
20th-century American politicians